Marietta DePrima Newbern (born May 3, 1964) is an American actress, best known for playing the role Sally Rogers, opposite actor Eric Allen Kramer, on the ABC/UPN sitcom, The Hughleys.

Early life
Marietta is a graduate of Carmel Catholic High School in Mundelein, IL and Saint Joseph Elementary School in Libertyville, IL.

Career
DePrima has appeared in many television programs including Family Ties, Tour of Duty, Quantum Leap, Boston Legal, Dear John, Diagnosis: Murder, and Matlock. She played Ariel in a Disney live-action puppet show called Little Mermaid's Island, as conceived by Jim Henson.

Personal life
DePrima and her husband, actor George Newbern, both graduated from Northwestern University, where she was a member of Kappa Alpha Theta, in 1986 with degrees in Radio/TV/Film. They were married in 1990, and have three children - Emma (b. 26 June 1995), Mae (b. 19 September 1998), and Ben (b. 25 November 2002).

References

External links

1964 births
Living people
Actresses from Chicago
American television actresses
American people of Italian descent
20th-century American actresses
21st-century American actresses
Northwestern University School of Communication alumni